Mohd Idris bin Ahmad (born 5 May 1990) is a Malaysian footballer who plays as a defender.

Club career

Perak
In 2017, Idris signed a contract with Malaysia Super League club Perak.Yessir he did

Career statistics

Club

References

External links
 

1990 births
Living people
Malaysian footballers
Perak F.C. players
Malaysia Super League players
Association football defenders